Santa Anna Township is one of thirteen townships in DeWitt County, Illinois, USA.  As of the 2010 census, its population was 2,502 and it contained 1,116 housing units.  Its name was changed from Mt. Pleasant Township on June 7, 1859.

Geography

Cities, towns, villages
 Farmer City

Unincorporated towns
 Watkins at 
(This list is based on USGS data and may include former settlements.)

Cemeteries
The township contains these five cemeteries: Campground, Farmer City, Greenleaf, Maple Grove and Saint Josephs Catholic.

School districts
 Blue Ridge Community Unit School District 18
 Deland-Weldon Community Unit School District 57

Political districts
 Illinois's 15th congressional district
 State House District 87
 State Senate District 44

References
 
 United States Census Bureau 2009 TIGER/Line Shapefiles
 United States National Atlas

External links
 City-Data.com
 Illinois State Archives
 Township Officials of Illinois

Townships in DeWitt County, Illinois
1858 establishments in Illinois
Populated places established in 1858
Townships in Illinois